The 1903–04 Connecticut Aggies men's basketball team represented Connecticut Agricultural College, now the University of Connecticut, in the 1903–04 collegiate men's basketball season. The Aggies completed the season with a 6–3 record against mostly local high schools. The Aggies were members of the Athletic League of New England State Colleges.

Schedule 

|-
!colspan=12 style=""| Regular Season

Schedule Source:

References 

UConn Huskies men's basketball seasons
Connecticut
1903 in sports in Connecticut
1904 in sports in Connecticut